The Convention on Road Traffic, commonly known as the Vienna Convention on Road Traffic, is an international treaty designed to facilitate international road traffic and to increase road safety by establishing standard traffic rules among the contracting parties. The convention was agreed upon at the United Nations Economic and Social Council's Conference on Road Traffic (7 October – 8 November 1968) and concluded in Vienna on 8 November 1968. It came into force on 21 May 1977. This conference also produced the Convention on Road Signs and Signals. The Convention had amendments on 3 September 1993 and 28 March 2006. There is a European Agreement supplementing the Convention on Road Traffic (1968), which was concluded in Geneva on 1 May 1971.

Contracting parties
The Vienna Convention on Road Traffic was concluded at Vienna on 8 November 1968. Since its entry into force on 21 May 1977, in signatory countries ("Contracting Parties") it replaces previous road traffic conventions, notably the 1949 Geneva Convention on Road Traffic, in accordance with Article 48 of the convention. As of October 2022, the convention has been ratified by 87 countries, but those who have not ratified the convention may still be parties to the 1949 Geneva Convention on Road Traffic. Ireland, Canada, the United States, Cyprus, Iceland, Malta, China and Malaysia are examples of non-signatory countries. Several other countries, such as Spain and Mexico, have signed the convention but have not ratified it.

Cross-border vehicles

One of the main benefits of the convention for motorists is the obligation on signatory countries to recognize the legality of vehicles from other signatory countries. The following requirements must be met when driving outside the country of registration:
 Cars must display their registration number at the front and rear, even if legislation in the jurisdiction of registration does not require a front vehicle registration plate on cars. Motorcycles need to display their registration number only at the rear. Registration numbers must be composed either of numerals or of numerals and letters. They must be displayed in capital Latin characters and Arabic numerals. In addition to this, the registration number may optionally be displayed in a different alphabet.
 A distinguishing sign of the country of registration  must be displayed on the rear of the vehicle. This sign may either be placed separately from the registration plate or may be incorporated into the vehicle registration plate. 
 The physical requirements for the separate sign are defined in Annex 3 of the Vienna Convention on Road Traffic, which states that the letters shall be in black on a white background having the shape of an ellipse with the major axis horizontal. The distinguishing sign should not be affixed in such a way that it could be confused with the registration number or impair its legibility. 
When the distinguishing sign is incorporated into the registration plate, it must also appear on the front registration plate of the vehicle, and may be supplemented with the flag or emblem of the national state, or the emblem of the regional economic integration organization to which the country belongs. The distinguishing sign should be displayed on the far left or far right on the registration plate. When a symbol/flag/emblem is also displayed, the distinguishing sign shall obligatorily be placed on the far left on the plate. The distinguishing sign shall be positioned to be easily identifiable and so that it cannot be confused with the registration number or impair its legibility. The distinguishing sign shall therefore be at least a different color from the registration number, or have a different background color to that reserved for the registration number, or be clearly separated from the registration number, preferably with a line.
 The vehicle must meet all technical requirements to be legal for road use in the country of registration. Any conflicting technical requirements (e.g., right-hand-drive or left-hand-drive) in the signatory country where the vehicle is being driven do not apply.
 The driver must carry the vehicle's registration certificate, and if the vehicle is not registered in the name of an occupant of the vehicle (e.g., a hire car), proof of the driver's right to be in possession of the vehicle.

The convention also addresses minimum mechanical and safety equipment needed to be on board and defines an identification mark (Annex 4) to identify the origin of the vehicle.

Vienna Convention and autonomous driving
One of the fundamental principles of the Convention has been the concept that a driver is always fully in control and responsible for the behavior of a vehicle in traffic. This requirement is challenged by the development of technology for collision avoidance systems and autonomous driving.

Since 2021, an automated driving system definition is proposed — in Article 1 of Convention on Road Traffic — as a vehicle system that uses both hardware and software to exercise dynamic control of a vehicle on a sustained basis where Dynamic control is defined as carrying out all the real-time operational and tactical functions required to move the vehicle. This includes controlling the vehicle’s lateral and longitudinal motion, monitoring the road, responding to events in the road traffic, and planning and signalling for manoeuvres.

According to a British explanatory Memorandum on the Proposal of Amendment to Article 1 and new Article 34 bis of the 1968 Convention on Road Traffic, 
this amendment should enter into force 18 months following the date of its circulation, on 14 July 2022, unless it is rejected before 13 January 2022.

International Driving Permit 
The Vienna Convention on Road Traffic is the newest of three conventions that governs International Driving Permits. The other two are the 1926 Paris International Convention relative to Motor Traffic and the 1949 Geneva Convention on Road Traffic. When a state is contracting to more than one convention, the newest one terminate and replace previous ones in relation between those states.

The main regulations about driving licences are in Annex 6 (domestic driving permit) and Annex 7 (International Driving Permit). The currently active version of those is in force in each contracting party since no later than 29 March 2011 (Article 43). According to the 1968 Vienna Convention, an IDP must have an expiration date of no more than three years from its issue date or until the expiration date of national driving permit, whichever is earlier, and it is valid for a period of one year upon the arrival in the foreign country.

Article 41 of the convention describes requirements for driving licences. Key of those are:
 every driver of a motor vehicle must hold a driving licence;
 driving licences can be issued only after passing theoretical and practical exams, which are regulated by each country or jurisdiction;
 Contracting parties shall recognize as valid for driving in their territories:
 any domestic driving licence drawn up in their national language or in one of their national languages, or, if not drawn up in such a language, accompanied by a certified translation;
 domestic driving licence conforms to the provisions of annex 6 to the convention;
 International Driving Permit conforms to the provisions of annex 7 to the convention, on condition that it is presented with the corresponding domestic driving licence;
 driving licences issued by a contracting party shall be recognised in the territory of another contracting party until this territory becomes the place of normal residence of their holder;
 all of the above does not apply to learner-driver licences;
 the period of validity of an international driving permit shall be either no more than three years after the date of issue or until the date of expiry of the domestic driving licence, whichever is earlier;
 Contracting parties may refuse to recognise the validity of driving licences for persons under eighteen or, for categories C, D, CE and DE, under twenty-one;
 an international driving permit shall only be issued by the contracting party in whose territory the holder has their normal residence and that issued the domestic driving licence or that recognised the driving licence issued by another contracting party; it shall not be valid for use in that territory.

Prior to 29 March 2011, annex 6 and annex 7 defined forms of driver's licences that are different from those defined after that date. Driving licences issued before 29 March 2011 that match older edition of the annexes are valid until their expiration dates (article 43).

Before 29 March 2011 the convention demanded contracting parties to recognise as valid for driving in their territories:
 any domestic driver's licence drawn up in their national language or in one of their national languages, or, if not drawn up in such a language, accompanied by a certified translation;
 any domestic driver's licence conforming to the provisions of annex 6 to the convention; and
 any international driver permit conforming to the provisions of annex 7 to the convention.

International conventions on transit transport 
The broad objective of these international conventions and agreements, the depositary of which is the Secretary-General of the United Nations, is to facilitate international transport while providing for a high level of safety, security, and environmental protection in transport:
 Agreement on the International Carriage of Perishable Foodstuffs and on the Special Equipment to be used for such Carriage (ATP) (1970)
 Convention on Customs Treatment of Pool Containers Used in International Transport (1994)
 Convention on the Contract for the International Carriage of Goods By Road (1956) and its protocol (1978)
 Convention concerning Customs Facilities for Touring (1954)
 Customs Convention on Containers (1956, 1972)
 Customs Convention on the Temporary Importation of Commercial Road Vehicles (1956)
 Customs Convention on the Temporary Importation of Private Road Vehicles (1954)
 European Agreement concerning the International Carriage of Dangerous Goods by Road (ADR) (1957) and its Protocol amending articles 1 and 14  (1993)
 Geneva Convention on Road Traffic (1949)
 European Agreement concerning the Work of Crews of Vehicles engaged in International Road Transport (1970)
 International Convention to Facilitate the Crossing of Frontiers for Passengers and Baggage Carried by Rail (1952)
 International Convention to Facilitate the Crossing of Frontiers for Goods Carried by Rail (1952)
 International Convention on the Harmonization of Frontier Controls of Goods (1982)
 TIR Convention

See also
 Vienna Convention on Road Signs and Signals
 List of international vehicle registration codes
 International Driving Permit
 Rules of the road

References

External links
 Ratifications (list of countries)
 Vienna Convention on Road Traffic (Consolidated version as at 28 March 2006).
 Distinguishing signs used on vehicles in international traffic
 Official text of the Convention on Road Traffic in English, French, Chinese, Russian and Spanish

Driving licences
Rules of the road
Traffic law
Road traffic management
Treaties concluded in 1968
Treaties entered into force in 1977
United Nations treaties
Treaties of Albania
Treaties of Armenia
Treaties of Austria
Treaties of Azerbaijan
Treaties of the Bahamas
Treaties of Bahrain
Treaties of the Byelorussian Soviet Socialist Republic
Treaties of Belgium
Treaties of Benin
Treaties of Bosnia and Herzegovina
Treaties of the People's Republic of Bulgaria
Treaties of the military dictatorship in Brazil
Treaties of the Central African Republic
Treaties of Ivory Coast
Treaties of Croatia
Treaties of Cuba
Treaties of Czechoslovakia
Treaties of the Czech Republic
Treaties of Denmark
Treaties of Zaire
Treaties of Estonia
Treaties of Ethiopia
Treaties of Finland
Treaties of France
Treaties of Georgia (country)
Treaties of West Germany
Treaties of East Germany
Treaties of Greece
Treaties of Guyana
Treaties of the Hungarian People's Republic
Treaties of Pahlavi Iran
Treaties of Israel
Treaties of Italy
Treaties of Kazakhstan
Treaties of Kenya
Treaties of Kuwait
Treaties of Kyrgyzstan
Treaties of Latvia
Treaties of Liberia
Treaties of Lithuania
Treaties of Luxembourg
Treaties of Monaco
Treaties of Mongolia
Treaties of Montenegro
Treaties of Morocco
Treaties of the Netherlands
Treaties of Niger
Treaties of Nigeria
Treaties of Norway
Treaties of Pakistan
Treaties of Peru
Treaties of the Philippines
Treaties of the Polish People's Republic
Treaties of Portugal
Treaties of Qatar
Treaties of Moldova
Treaties of the Socialist Republic of Romania
Treaties of the Soviet Union
Treaties of San Marino
Treaties of Senegal
Treaties of Serbia and Montenegro
Treaties of Yugoslavia
Treaties of Saudi Arabia
Treaties of Seychelles
Treaties of Slovakia
Treaties of Slovenia
Treaties of Sweden
Treaties of Switzerland
Treaties of Tajikistan
Treaties of South Africa
Treaties of North Macedonia
Treaties of Tunisia
Treaties of Turkey
Treaties of Turkmenistan
Treaties of Uganda
Treaties of the Ukrainian Soviet Socialist Republic
Treaties of the United Arab Emirates
Treaties of Uruguay
Treaties of Uzbekistan
Treaties of Vietnam
Treaties of Zimbabwe
Transport treaties
1968 in Austria
1968 in transport
Treaties extended to West Berlin
November 1968 events
1960s in Vienna